Hao Kexin (born 15 January 1986) is a Chinese handball player who competed in the 2008 Summer Olympics.

References

1986 births
Living people
Olympic handball players of China
Chinese male handball players
Handball players at the 2008 Summer Olympics
Handball players from Liaoning
People from Huludao
Handball players at the 2006 Asian Games
Asian Games competitors for China
21st-century Chinese people